Sammy Duvall is a retired water-skier who had victories at the Masters Tournaments and the World water skiing champions. One of his more noted victories being a "came from behind" victory at the 1987 world championship. He officially retired in 1998 and in 2001 he was inducted into Water Skiing Hall of Fame. His older sister Camille also had success in the sport.

References

External links 
 Sammy Duvall's Watersports Centre

Living people
American water skiers
Pan American Games medalists in water skiing
Pan American Games bronze medalists for the United States
World Games gold medalists
World Games bronze medalists
Competitors at the 1981 World Games
Year of birth missing (living people)
Competitors at the 1995 Pan American Games
Medalists at the 1995 Pan American Games
20th-century American people